Hengzhou, formerly, Heng County or Hengxian is a county-level city of Guangxi Zhuang Autonomous Region, China, it is under the administration of the prefecture-level city of Nanning, the capital of Guangxi, with a permanent population of 863,001 and a hukou population of 1,200,521 as of the 2010 Census. The easternmost county-level division of Nanning City, it borders the prefecture-level cities of Guigang to the northeast, Yulin to the east, and Qinzhou to the south. 60% speak Pinghua as there mother tongue and a further 30% speak Pingua as a second language. The county-level city was approved and elevated by the former Heng County by the State Council on February 3, 2021.

Administrative divisions
There are 14 towns and 3 townships in the county-level city:

Towns:
Hengzhou (横州镇), Luancheng (峦城镇), Liujing (六景镇), Shitang (石塘镇), Taoxu (陶圩镇), Xiaoyi (校椅镇), Yunbiao (云表镇), Baihe (百合镇), Nayang (那阳镇), Nanxiang (南乡镇), Xinfu (新福镇), Liantang (莲塘镇), Pingma (平马镇), Maling (马岭镇)

Townships:
Mashan Township (马山乡), Pinglang Township (平朗乡), Zhenlong Township (镇龙乡)

Climate

References

External links

 
Nanning
County-level divisions of Guangxi
Cities in Guangxi